Venera 9, manufacturer's designation: 4V-1 No. 660, was a Soviet uncrewed space mission to Venus. It consisted of an orbiter and a lander. The orbiter was the first spacecraft to orbit Venus, while the lander was the first to return images from the surface of another planet.

Orbiter

The orbiter entered Venus orbit on October 20, 1975. Its mission was to act as a communications relay for the lander and to explore cloud layers and atmospheric parameters with several instruments and experiments. It performed 17 survey missions from October 26, 1975, to December 25, 1975.

The orbiter consisted of a cylinder with two solar panel wings and a high gain parabolic antenna attached to the curved surface. A bell-shaped unit holding propulsion systems was attached to the bottom of the cylinder, and mounted on top was a  sphere which held the lander.

Orbiter design
The instruments composing the orbiter included:
 1.6–2.8 μm IR spectrometer
 8–28 μm IR radiometer
 352 nm UV photometer
 2 photo-polarimeters (335–800 nm)
 300–800 nm spectrometer
 Lyman-α (alpha) H/D spectrometer
 Bistatic radar mapping
 CM, DM radio occultations
 Triaxial Magnetometer
 345–380 nm UV camera
 355–445 nm camera
 6 electrostatic analyzers
 2 modulation ion traps
 Low-energy proton / alpha detector
 Low-energy electron detector
 3 semiconductor counters
 2 gas-discharge counters
 Cherenkov detector

Lander

The descent through the cloud layer took about 20 minutes, during which time the lander took measurements of the atmosphere and radioed the information to the orbiter. The landing device, a hollow ring surrounding the lower part of the lander, was partly crushed upon touchdown to take up most of the landing impact.

On October 20, 1975, the lander spacecraft separated from the orbiter, and landing was made with the Sun near zenith at 05:13 UTC on October 22.

It was the first spacecraft to return an image from the surface of another planet.  Many of the instruments began working immediately after touchdown and the cameras were operational 2 minutes later.  These instruments revealed a smooth surface with numerous stones.  The lander measured a light level of 14,000 lux, similar to that of Earth in full daylight but no direct sunshine.

A system of circulating fluid was used to distribute the heat load. This system, plus pre-cooling prior to entry, permitted operation of the lander for 53 minutes after landing, at which time radio contact with the orbiter was lost as the orbiter moved out of radio range. During descent, heat dissipation and deceleration were accomplished sequentially by protective hemispheric shells, three parachutes, a disc-shaped drag brake, and a compressible, metal, doughnut-shaped landing cushion.

It also measured atmospheric chemicals including hydrochloric acid, hydrofluoric acid, bromine and iodine. Venera 9 was the first probe to send back television pictures (black and white) from the Venusian surface, showing no shadows, no apparent dust in the air, and a variety of  rocks which were not eroded. Planned 360-degree panoramic pictures could not be taken because one of two camera lens covers failed to come off, limiting pictures to 180 degrees. This failure recurred with Venera 10.

Lander payload
The lander payload was as follows:
 Temperature and pressure sensors
 Accelerometer
 Visible / IR photometer – IOV-75
 Backscatter and multi-angle nephelometers – MNV-75
 P-11 mass spectrometer – MAV-75
 Panoramic telephotometers (2, with lamps)
 Anemometer – ISV-75
 Gamma-ray spectrometer – GS-12V
 Gamma-ray densitometer – RP-75

See also

 List of missions to Venus
 Timeline of artificial satellites and space probes

References

Venera program
1975 in spaceflight
1975 in the Soviet Union
Derelict landers (spacecraft)
Spacecraft launched in 1975
4MV
Non Earth orbiting satellites of the Soviet Union